AF-2 or variant, may refer to:
 Furylfuramide
 , US Navy stores ship
 Grumman AF-2 Guardian, ASW carrier plane
 (43797) 1991 AF2, an asteroid
 (9652) 1996 AF2, an asteroid
 Australian Formula 2
 arenafootball2

See also
 2 AF, the Second Air Force
 FA2 (disambiguation)